The 2011–12 Major Indoor Soccer League season was the third under the MISL banner and fourth season overall. It was also the 34th season of professional Division 1 indoor soccer. The Milwaukee Wave won their sixth title in franchise history and second MISL title in a row.

In May 2011, the United Soccer Leagues announced it had entered into an agreement with the MISL to operate the indoor league. In September, the Chicago Kick announced that they were unable to secure an arena in time to begin play for 2011–12 but planned to join the MISL in 2012–13.

Besides the aborted team in Chicago, other franchises were added in Syracuse, Norfolk, Rochester, and Wichita. Of the four, the reborn Rochester Lancers were the most successful, finishing second in league attendance and qualifying for the league playoffs.

Teams

New teams

Teams that left the MISL

Standings

Eastern Division

Central Division

Updated to matches played on March 5, 2012.

Statistics

Top scorers

Last updated on March 8, 2012. Source: MISL.com Statistics - Total Points

Top 2pt goal scorers

Last updated on March 8, 2012. Source: MISL.com Statistics - 2 Point Goals

Playoffs
Both rounds of the playoffs were in a home and home format. The higher seed had the option to choose whether to host the first or second game. A mini-game would be held immediately after Game 2 if the series was tied at one win apiece. Baltimore had the top seed, due to their 2–1 season series win over Milwaukee.

Division Finals

Game 1

Game 2

MISL Finals

Game 1

Game 2

Awards

All-League First Team

All-League Second Team

All-Rookie Team

References

Major Indoor Soccer League
Major Indoor Soccer League (2008–2014) seasons
Major Indoor Soccer League
Major Indoor Soccer League